Even Thorsen ( 26 August 1778 – 24 March 1867 ) was a Norwegian sailor, farmer, and representative at the Norwegian Constituent Assembly at Eidsvoll.

Even Thorsen was born at the Bjornes farm at Austre Moland (now Moland), in  Arendal in  Aust-Agder, Norway. In his youth, he went to sea working as a deckhand. During the Napoleonic wars, he was a prisoner of war in the United Kingdom from 1807, returning to Norway in 1810.  As an adult, he lived with his family at Blekestrand, a farm in Flosta in Aust-Agder.

He represented the Royal Norwegian Navy (Sjødefensjonen) at the Norwegian Constituent Assembly in 1814. Thorsen sympathized with the Independence Party (Selvstendighetspartiet). In 1857, the Norwegian Parliament granted him  an annual honorary pension three years prior to his death.

References

1778 births
1867 deaths
Aust-Agder politicians
Norwegian sailors
Napoleonic Wars prisoners of war held by the United Kingdom
Royal Dano-Norwegian Navy personnel
Royal Norwegian Navy personnel
Norwegian prisoners of war in the Napoleonic Wars
Fathers of the Constitution of Norway